The Best of Joss Stone 2003–2009 is the first greatest hits album by English singer and songwriter Joss Stone, released on 23 September 2011 by Virgin Records. Initially announced under the title Super Duper Hits: The Best of Joss Stone, the compilation contains songs from all of Stone's studio albums released under EMI: The Soul Sessions (2003), Mind Body & Soul (2004), Introducing Joss Stone (2007) and Colour Me Free! (2009).

Stone expressed her reluctance towards the album's release in an August 2011 interview with The San Francisco Examiner, stating, "They [EMI] are not allowed to do that—I do have a say, and I have to approve all the songs that they use, all the artwork, and especially the title. And oh my God, I've never heard such a cheesy title in all my life! And I don't know what kind of hits they're gonna put on there, because I've never had any hits!"

Critical reception

AllMusic critic Stephen Thomas Erlewine stated, "If this doesn't dig deep, it nevertheless hits all the highlights [...] drawing a picture of the decade when Stone was always on the cusp of stardom yet never quite truly there. As introductions go, it's a solid one, capturing her potential and promise, alternating between singles frustrating and fun."

In a mixed review, Victor Valdivia of PopMatters noted that the album has "all of the songs she's most known for assembled in a package that's meant to cement her status as a major artist. What the collection actually does, however, is underline the contradictions that have always made Stone's work so difficult to embrace. Stone has a fine voice but she doesn't seem to actually live or feel her songs. She just sings them with uncanny technical precision."

Track listing

Charts

Release history

References

2011 greatest hits albums
Albums produced by Questlove
Albums produced by Raphael Saadiq
Contemporary R&B compilation albums
Joss Stone albums
S-Curve Records albums
Soul compilation albums
Virgin Records compilation albums